The discography of the American rock band Heart consists of 15 studio albums, nine live albums, nine compilation albums, 64 singles and 35 music videos. They have sold about 35 million records worldwide.

Albums

Studio albums

Live albums

Notes

Compilation albums

Singles

A "All I Wanna Do Is Make Love to You" is the only single released by Heart to be certified gold by the RIAA.
B Peaked at number 19 on the Billboard Rock Single Sales chart.

Other appearances

Music videos, VHS and DVD releases

 1977: "Love Alive"
 1977: "Little Queen"
 1977: "Barracuda"
 1980: "Even It Up"
 1980: "Break"
 1980: "Tell It Like It Is"
 1982: "This Man Is Mine"
 1982: "City's Burning"
 1982: "The Situation"
 1983: "How Can I Refuse"
 1983: "Allies"
 1985: "What About Love"
 1985: "Never"
 1986: "These Dreams"
 1986: "Nothin' at All"
 1987: "Alone"
 1987: "Who Will You Run To"
 1988: "There's the Girl"
 1990: "All I Wanna Do Is Make Love to You"
 1990: "I Didn't Want to Need You"
 1990: "Stranded"
 1991: "Secret"
 1991: "You're the Voice"
 1993: "Will You Be There (In the Morning)"
 2003: "Alive in Seattle" (DVD/Blu-ray)
 2010: "WTF"
 2012: "Fanatic"
 2012: "Dear Old America"
 2016: Live at the Royal Albert Hall with the Royal Philharmonic Orchestra (DVD)
 2019: Live in Atlantic City (DVD/Blu-ray)

"What About Love", "These Dreams", "Alone", "Who Will You Run To" and "There's the Girl" were released on VHS in 1988 under the title If Looks Could Kill.

A video version of The Road Home has been issued on both VHS (1995) and DVD (2003).

Lovemongers releases 
Ann & Nancy Wilson have also recorded albums under the moniker Lovemongers, an informal acoustic music side-project with long-time Heart contributing writer Sue Ennis as a fellow band member. Their second full-length album was later re-released presented by Heart.

References

Discographies of American artists
Discography
Rock music group discographies